is a near-Earth object discovered in 1999 having a comet-like orbit. Its semi-major axis is 17.8 AU. Its orbital eccentricity is 0.94, which means that at the perihelion  comes as close as 0.9 AU to the Sun, while at the aphelion it reaches beyond the orbit of Neptune.  is a damocloid.  is a small object with an absolute magnitude (H) of 17.2, which implies a size of about 1 km.

 came to perihelion on 21 October 1999, passed  from Earth on 5 November 1999, and was discovered on 2 December 1999 at about apparent magnitude 16.9.

References

External links 
 
 
 

Damocloids
Minor planet object articles (unnumbered)

19991202